Affiliate Tracking Software  is used to track the referral, endorsement or recommendation made by one person or company to buy products or services from another person or company. Tracking is necessary to manage and reward or compensate the participants of an affiliate marketing group of participants or affiliate networks. The original concept comes from Affinity marketing. The participants that agree to promote or be promoted are called "affiliates". Those that promote and recommend are called "marketers" and the ones that have the products or services that are promoted are called "advertisers".

The affiliate tracking software can be self-hosted or operate in a cloud. Regardless of that, trackers record page views and clicks of advertising material (banners, clicks, etc.), while also recording conversions, i.e. events that are deemed valuable by the marketers.

Several online businesses create affiliate networks to manage affiliates that promote their products and services. Affiliate platforms are companies that intermediate and manage both marketers and advertisers, operating as a broker.

Tracked actions 
The core of affiliate marketing software is tracking the various aspects of a given action, that are commonly categorized in eight types:
 CPC (Cost per click)
 CPA (Cost per acquisition)
 CPM (Cost per impression)
 CPS (Cost per sale)
 CPI (Cost per install)
 CPL (Cost Per Lead)
 CPV (Cost Per Visitor)
 CPO (Cost Per Order)

Tracking refers to user-client IP detection, browser detection, marketer's affiliate referral and advertiser's completed transaction.

The main feature of affiliate marketing software is consolidation of data that allows marketers and advertisers to perform various marketing optimization techniques.

Although affinity marketing refers to marketing to persons sharing the same interests, the derived affiliate networks is closely related to sales channels and sales campaigns paying sales commissions, the reason why a solid and reliable software is required to prevent fraud and provide security and privacy for the parties involved in the transactions.

Affiliate tracking and conversion attribution 
While affiliate tracking is a key component of any affiliate tracking software, it is usually closely tied to conversion attribution models such as "first click" or "last click" attribution. "In fact, regardless of your marketing activity, tracking a conversion has no real value unless you can attribute it to the traffic source, keyword and campaign that brought the user in the first place.

The attribution model applies a business rule that credits a tracked conversion to the first or last affiliate that referred the visitor to the merchant's website.

Affiliate tracking software features 
 Generating Tracking Codes: Tracking of all clicks and leads require a special unique URL which contains the affiliate id and perhaps the campaign number, that is parsed to the advertiser's site and then associated with a user cookie to identify landing page, visit date, expire date, user identification and related sales closing information. These tracking URLs are also called as tracking codes. The software can generate a code, token or shortened URL, or can track by affiliate name. However, on January 14 Google announced that it would stop supporting 3-rd party cookies in 2 years. It caused the rise in popularity of (cookie-less and direct tracking methods) as reliable and safe alternatives for 3-rd party cookies-based methods.
 Tracking Time and Location: Tracking time and location of impression, click, lead and sale, usually gathered from user cookies, sent back from the advertiser's server site to the tracking software server for consolidation.
 Tracking Source: Not just the location source, as previously cited, source also refers to web page originating the URL link (blog article for instance) and source type (banner, keyword, search, chatbot or other),  that gives both marketers and advertisers the information to improve context and maximize click-through ratios (how many times are required to show a banner to have someone click on it) and sales conversion (how many clicks are required to have someone buy the referred product/service).
 Tracking Affiliate: Identify volume and effectiveness. Volume in traffic and effectiveness is how successful the affiliate is in selling (or making money for the network).
 Fraud Detection: The need of fraud detection has increased with the expansion of affiliate marketing industry and the availability of IP changing software, chatbots that can simulate clicks and purchases, and even hacking to inject data into the software database to inflate affiliate credits and ratios.
 Tracking GEO, ISP, Browser, Device, OS, IP etc.
Server-side tracking: Because affiliate marketers refer visitors from their own website to a merchant website, and since cross domain tracking is blocked by browser tracking preventions, affiliate tracking software provide server to server tracking methods. Server to server tracking methods (also called Postback URL tracking) allow the affiliate tracking software to receive notifications when a conversion is being triggered by the merchant.

References

Affiliate marketing